Pablo Aja Fresnedo  (born 28 January 1986) is a former Mexican footballer, who played for Correcaminos UAT in Mexico's Ascenso MX. He is a product of Puebla FC's youth system.

Career
Born in Puebla, Mexico, Aja began his career 2006 in his hometown team and made his debut on 4 November 2007 in a 3–0 loss against Chivas. He helped the team return to Primera División (first division) in 2008.

External links
Puebla F.C. Player Profile
 Stats at Mediotiempo.com

Footnotes

1986 births
Living people
Footballers from Puebla
Association football midfielders
Club Puebla players
Correcaminos UAT footballers
Venados F.C. players
Liga MX players
Mexican footballers